Velko Bratanov (born 26 July 1949) is a Bulgarian former modern pentathlete. He competed at the 1972 and 1976 Summer Olympics.

References

1949 births
Living people
Bulgarian male modern pentathletes
Olympic modern pentathletes of Bulgaria
Modern pentathletes at the 1972 Summer Olympics
Modern pentathletes at the 1976 Summer Olympics
People from Nova Zagora